GRUR can refer to

 German Association for the Protection of Intellectual Property (German: Deutsche Vereinigung für gewerblichen Rechtsschutz und Urheberrecht)
 Gewerblicher Rechtsschutz und Urheberrecht, its journal

See also 
 Gewerblicher Rechtsschutz und Urheberrecht, Rechtsprechungs-Report (GRUR-RR)
 GRUR International